Guido Reybrouck (born 25 December 1941 in Bruges) is a Belgian former road bicycle racer. He is an older brother of Wilfried Reybrouck and the cousin of Gustave Danneels.

Major results

1964
 1st Paris–Tours
 1st Züri-Metzgete
 1st Stage 2 Tour de l'Oise
 2nd Overall Tour du Nord
 2nd Overall Tour du Loir-et-Cher
1st Stage 1
1965
 1st Kuurne–Brussels–Kuurne
 Tour de France
1st Stages 6 & 10 
 1st Stage 5 Tour of Belgium
 2nd Overall Paris–Luxembourg
 2nd Omloop van het Leiedal
 4th Paris–Tours
 6th Omloop Het Volk
 6th GP de Fourmies
 8th Milan–San Remo
 9th De Kustpijl
1966
 1st  Road race, National Road Championships
 1st Paris–Tours
 1st Stage 2 Tour de France
 2nd Omloop der Vlaamse Ardennen Ichtegem
 4th Tour of Flanders
 7th Road race, UCI Road World Championships
 7th Paris–Brussels
1967
 1st Elfstedenronde
 Tour de France
1st Stages 4 & 9 
 1st Stage 1 Vuelta a España
 Paris–Nice
1st Stages 1 & 3 
 7th Tour of Flanders
 10th De Kustpijl
1968
 1st Paris–Tours
 1st Circuit des Frontières
 Giro d'Italia
1st Stages 3, 11 & 22 
 Paris–Luxembourg
1st Stage 2 & 3a (TTT) 
 Setmana Catalana de Ciclisme
1st Stages 2 & 4 
 1st Stage 1 Volta a Catalunya
 1st Stage 3 Giro di Sardegna
 3rd Road race, National Road Championships
 3rd GP Flandria
 9th Paris–Roubaix
1969
 1st Amstel Gold Race
 1st Barcelona–Andorra
 1st Stage 13 Tour de France
 1st Stage 1 Setmana Catalana de Ciclisme
 4th Road race, UCI Road World Championships
 8th Züri-Metzgete
1970
 Vuelta a España
1st  Points classification
1st  Combination classification
1st Stages 4, 8 & 10
 1st Stage 7a Paris–Nice
 1st Stage 3 Giro di Sardegna
 2nd Overall Paris–Luxembourg
 2nd Milano–Torino
 3rd Paris–Tours
 10th Milan–San Remo
1971
 1st  Overall Tour de la Nouvelle-France
 1st Stage 4b Giro di Sardegna
 1st Stage 3 Tirreno–Adriatico
 1st Stage 4 Volta a Catalunya
 2nd GP Alghero
 3rd GP Stad Zottegem
 7th E3 Prijs Vlaanderen
 8th Omloop Het Volk
1972
 1st  Overall Tour de la Nouvelle-France
1st Stage 1 
 1st GP Cemab
 Vuelta a Levante
1st Stages 4 & 5 
 3rd Elfstedenronde
 6th Paris–Tours
1973
 1st Stage 2 Tour de l'Oise
 6th De Kustpijl
1974
 5th Omloop van de Vlaamse Scheldeboorden

External links

Profile by cyclinghalloffame.com
 

1941 births
Belgian male cyclists
Living people
Belgian Tour de France stage winners
Belgian Giro d'Italia stage winners
Belgian Vuelta a España stage winners
Sportspeople from Bruges
Cyclists from West Flanders
20th-century Belgian people